The Heinkel He 45 was a light bomber produced in Germany in the early 1930s, one of the first aircraft adopted by the newly formed Luftwaffe. Its appearance was that of a conventional biplane and included seating for pilot and gunner in tandem, open cockpits. Developed in parallel with the He 46, it appeared in 1931 as a general-purpose biplane and was employed mainly as a trainer, but was also used by the Luftwaffe for reconnaissance and light bombing duties. Production of this plane totalled 512 aircraft, including those built under licence by Gotha, Focke-Wulf, and BFW.

Variants
He 45a
First prototype, powered by a BMW VI 7,3Z piston engine.
He 45b
Second prototype, fitted with four-blade propeller.
He 45c
Third prototype, armed with one 7.92 mm (.312 in) forward-firing MG 17 machine gun, and one 7.92 mm MG 15 machine gun in the rear cockpit.
He 45A
Initial production version.
He 45A-1
Training version.
He 45A-2
Reconnaissance version.
He 45B
Improved production version.
He 45B-1
Reconnaissance version, armed with a 7.92 mm (0.312 in) machine gun.
He 45B-2
Able to carry a 100 kg (220 lb) bombload.
He 45C
Production version of the He 45c.
He 45D
Slightly improved version. Similar to the He 45C.
HD 61a
Reconnaissance export version of He 45B intended for China, powered by a 492 kW (660 hp) BMW VI piston engine.

Operators

Bulgarian Air Force

One HD 61a tested and crashed during a demonstration on 22 August 1931.

Luftwaffe

Royal Hungarian Air Force operated a single He 45C.

Spanish Air Force

Specifications (He 45C)

See also

References

Notes

Bibliography

Biplanes
Heinkel He 045
He 045
Single-engined tractor aircraft
Aircraft first flown in 1931